Pancotto is a soup prepared with pieces of stale bread boiled in broth or water and seasoned.

It is a dish from the cuisine of recovery that recalls the thrifty and humble mentality of the peasant culture that never would have wasted a crumb of bread, present in all regions of Italy with infinite variations due to the type of bread, the liquid used and the cooking process. As a consequence, it is called in different ways, such as: Lombard panada, Ligurian pancheuto, Sardinian pane cottu.

In the past, especially in Lombardy and in Tuscany, it was used to promote lactation and it was served to convalescents.

Pancotto across Italy 
Tuscan pancotto includes a soffritto of basic herbs and vegetables, such as tomatoes, then wet with liquid, water or broth, and cooked for 10 minutes, to which bread is added.

Pancotto from Latium and Calabria requires that all ingredients, basic vegetables (tomatoes) and herbs (basil, garlic, pecorino cheese, spices), bread, broth or water are cooked together right from the beginning for about thirty minutes; pancotto from Calabria also includes the addition of hot peppers.

Pancotto from Apulia requires that the basic vegetables (tomatoes, potatoes, zucchini, turnip tops) are cooked in the liquid to which bread is then added, while the herbs are sautéed separately and added to the rest only at the time of serving.

Lombard pancotto calls for bread to be soaked in broth and once soaked it is cooked with fat and aromatic vegetables until boiling.

Pancotto from Torremaggiore (a town in the Alto Tavoliere area in the province of Foggia) is prepared according to local tradition; vegetables such as: chard, turnips, cabbage, potatoes and zucchini are boiled with the addition of garlic cloves, after cooking stale bread is added. At the end of cooking everything is drained and served with raw oil. This is a typical recipe from Torremaggiorese.

Pane cotto, typical recipe of Lucanian cuisine.

See also

References

Bibliography

External links 
 

Italian cuisine
Bread soups